Birkat HaBayit (meaning Blessing for the Home) is a Jewish prayer often inscribed on wall plaques or hamsas and featured at the entrance of some Jewish homes. There are various versions of the prayer.

Text

Italian translation: 
Che nessun dolore passi per questa porta.

Che nessun problema entri in questa dimora.

Che nessuna paura entri da questa porta.

Che nessun conflitto entri in questo dipartimento.

Che ci sia benedizione e pace in questo luogo.

In the home, the Birkat Habayit is traditionally hung on the wall next to the front door or next to a window: it is meant to drive any evil spirits out of the house and protect the occupants within. Besides bringing a blessing upon the home, variations from around the world are also seen as brilliant works of art and are often given as housewarming gifts.

A Birkat HaEsek, "Blessing for the Business," is also popular in Israel.

Origin 

There are conflicting theories as to the origin of this prayer.

Moshe Teitelbaum 

There is a variation of it that appears in an amulet for protection against plague. This amulet is from 1925 and is attributed to Rebbe Moshe Teitelbaum.

Modern Hebrew poetry 

According to Rabbi Shlomo Aviner, the style of this prayer is not Jewish, as it has no "Yehi Ratzon" or "Ribbon Ha'Olamim" and does not address God in any way. He postulates that this prayer originates from a poem created by Rudyard Kipling, although there is no proof of this claim.

See also 

 Mezuzah

References

Jewish prayer and ritual texts
Hebrew words and phrases in Jewish prayers and blessings